Edmond Lefebvre du Prey (16 October 1866 in Saint-Omer – 14 January 1955) was a French politician of the Third Republic.

Lefebvre du Prey was a member of the National Assembly from 1909 to 1927 and then in the Senate from 1927 to 1940.

References

1866 births
1955 deaths
People from Saint-Omer
French Ministers of Agriculture
Senators of Pas-de-Calais